James "Bub" Miller is an American former Negro league third baseman who played in the 1930s.

Miller played for the Homestead Grays and the Atlanta Black Crackers in 1938. In four recorded games, he posted three hits in 17 plate appearances.

References

External links
 and Seamheads

Year of birth missing
Place of birth missing
Atlanta Black Crackers players
Homestead Grays players
Baseball third basemen